The 2014–15 KNVB Cup was the 97th season of the Dutch national football knockout tournament. The competition began on 27 August 2014 with the matches of Round 1 and ended with the final on 3 May 2015. The winner qualified for the group stage of the 2015–16 UEFA Europa League.

FC Groningen won their first cup title in club history.

Calendar
The calendar for the 2014–15 KNVB Cup was as follows.

Source: Royal Dutch Football Association

First round
Matches scheduled on 26 & 27 August 2014.

Second round
Matches scheduled on 23 & 24 September 2014.

Third round
The matches took place on 28, 29 and 30 October 2014.

Fourth round
The matches took place on 16, 17, 18 December 2014 and 20 January 2015.

Quarter-finals

Semi-finals

Final

Trivia

None of the Big Three managed to advance to the quarter-finals. This happened for only the fourth time in fifty years (after the 1974-75, 1981-82 and 2008-09 campaigns).

References

External links
  

2014-15
2014–15 European domestic association football cups
KNVB